Rajat Kanti Sen is an Indian first-class cricketer who played for Tripura. He is also a cricket coach. He was the first  Ranji Trophy captain from Tripura.

See also 
 List of Tripura cricketers

References 

Indian cricketers
Tripura cricketers
Cricketers from Tripura
Year of birth missing (living people)
Living people